Flora Carabella (15 February 1926 – 19 April 1999) was an Italian film, television and stage actress.

Life and career
Born in Rome, the daughter of the composer Ezio, Carabella studied acting at the Silvio d’Amico Academy of Dramatic Arts and began working as an actress on stage, first with Orazio Costa and then in the company of Luchino Visconti. In 1950 she married Marcello Mastroianni, from whom she never filed for divorce, in spite of Mastroianni's well-known romantic relationships. They had a daughter, Barbara. In 1976 Carabella reportedly offered to adopt her estranged husband's daughter by Catherine Deneuve, Chiara Mastroianni, whose parents' careers were demanding. Carabella's intermittent career includes films by Roberto Rossellini, Lina Wertmüller and Sergio Citti. She died in 1999, aged 73, of a bone tumor.

Partial filmography
I basilischi (1963) - Luciana Bonfanti
Il messia (1975) - Herodias
Lunatics and Lovers (1976) - Aunt Luisa
Beach House (1977) - La nonna 
A Night Full of Rain (1978) - Friend
Viuuulentemente mia (1982) - Elvira - Anna's mother
Journey with Papa (1982) - Luciana
State buoni se potete (1983) 
La Cage aux Folles 3: The Wedding (1985)
Donne in un giorno di festa (1993) - Suor Faustina
Quando finiranno le zanzare (1994) - (final film role)

References

External links

 

1926 births
1999 deaths
Actresses from Rome
20th-century Italian actresses
Italian film actresses
Italian stage actresses
Italian television actresses
Accademia Nazionale di Arte Drammatica Silvio D'Amico alumni
Deaths from cancer in Lazio
Deaths from bone cancer